The 1999 Wismilak International doubles was the doubles event of the fifth edition of the most prestigious women's tennis tournament held in Southeast Asia. It was not played the previous year, so there was no defending champion.

Jelena Kostanić and Tina Pisnik won in the final, 3–6, 6–2, 6–4, against Japanese Rika Hiraki and Yuka Yoshida, to win their respective second and first WTA Tour titles.

Seeds

Draw

Qualifying

Seeds

Qualifiers
  Evelyn Fauth /  Miroslava Vavrinec

Qualifying draw

References
 ITF doubles results page

Doubles
Wismilak International - Doubles